Arlington Park is author Rachel Cusk's seventh book.

Plot

Focussing on a single day in an affluent English suburb, the book chronicles the lives of five middle-class married women, all of them mothers of young children. Going about their routines of child-rearing, work, shopping and socialising, they dwell of their feelings of frustration and disappointment, memories good and bad, aspirations and sometimes flashes of inspiration and hope. The five meet in the evening at a dinner party hosted by one of them.

Characters

The five women are Juliet Randall, Amanda Clapp, Maisie Carrington, Stephanie Sykes, and Christine Lanham who hosts the dinner party. The Guardian noted a literary parallel, describing Christine as "a drolly jaundiced version of Virginia Woolf's Mrs Dalloway".

Awards

Arlington Park was on the 2007 Orange Prize for Fiction shortlist.

References
	
 Contemporary Writers in the UK

2006 British novels
Books about Virginia Woolf
Faber and Faber books
Novels by Rachel Cusk
Novels set in one day